This is a list of films produced in Taiwan ordered by year of release. For an alphabetical list of Taiwanese films see :Category:Taiwanese films

1970

1971

1972

1976

1977

1979

References

External links
 Taiwanese film at the Internet Movie Database

1970s
1970s in Taiwan
Taiwan